Leanne Kemp is an Australian tech entrepreneur. She is founder and CEO of Everledger and Queensland Chief Entrepreneur. She is recognised internationally as an innovator and leader

Career 
Kemp has a background in emerging technologies, business, jewelry, and insurance. She is the founder & CEO of Everledger, a company that uses blockchain to track the provenance of high-value assets. The goal of the platform is to help insurers, claimants and other stakeholders combat fraud and money laundering. In 2018, the company closed a $20 million Series A round which saw the company valued at over $110 million .

Kemp sits on boards for the IBM Blockchain Board of Advisors, the World Trade Board, and the World Economic Forum's blockchain council. Everledger has won awards including the Meffy Award 2015 for innovation in FinTech, BBVA Open Talent 2015, Fintech Finals Best in Show Award 2016 Hong Kong and was a nominee for The FT ArcelorMittal Boldness in Business Awards 2016.

Kemp also held the position of Queensland Chief Entrepreneur from 2018 until 2020, an honorary role of the Queensland Government.

Kemp joined OpenUK as their Chief Sustainability Officer in late2022.

Awards 
In 2016, Kemp was named in UK Business Insider's 26 Coolest Women in UK Tech 2016 and Brummell Magazine's Top 30 Female Innovators. She was elected as one of the Europe's and the World's Top 50 Women in Tech in 2018. She has also been named an IBM Champion in 2018. In that same year, she also received a reward from the Advance Global Australian Award in the area of Technological Innovation. 

2019 Fintech Top50 
GBBC Australian Ambassador 
FT Top10 Market Shapers 
2019 Global Leader of the Year <finalist> 
Forbes World's Top 50 Women in Tech 2018 Advance Award: Winner of the Technology Innovation Award 
Forbes Top 50 
Women In Tech {Europe} 
2018 IBM Champion 2018 
Innovator of the Year 
Top 50 Blockchain Startups 
2017 Listed
Top 100 Disruptive Brands of 2017 
101 Rising Stars London Winner 
Global Open Innovation Business Contest 5.0 Shortlisted for Ethical Jewellery Business of the Year 
Best B2B Startup – Digital Top 50 Awards Penrose Award: 2016 Innovator of the Year 
Inspirational Female Innovator MEDICI Top 21 – Blockchain Awards 
26 Coolest Women in UK Tech

Public speaking 
Kemp has talked at events such as TedxBrussels. She has also been on multiple speaking platforms. In September 2018, she had the opportunity to discuss multiple environmental agendas with multiple panelist, including former Vice President Al Gore, at the WEF Impact Summit in New York.

References 

Living people
Year of birth missing (living people)
21st-century Australian businesspeople
Australian chief executives